The 2021 UCI Track Cycling World Championships were held from 20 to 24 October 2021 at the Velodrome Couvert Regional Jean-Stablinski in Roubaix, France. The championships were originally scheduled to be held in Ashgabat, Turkmenistan. The elimination race was introduced for the first time in the history of World Championships

Bidding
Turkmenistan showed their interest in hosting the championships at the Opening Ceremony of the Olympic Council of Asia General Assembly in September 2015. The Central Asian country's President Gurbanguly Berdimuhamedov expressed his intention in which he reiterated his aim to use sport to raise the profile of the nation. Berdimuhamedov described the proposal as "fully in accord" with the plans of the nation, adding that the country has "all the necessary conditions". Igor Makarov, the Ashgabat-born president of the Russian Cycling Federation, outlined the attractions of the Ashgabat Sports Complex Velodrome. The velodrome is among the largest velodromes in the world with room for 6000 spectators. He appealed directly to the president to consider bidding for the event. The championships would represent the largest-profile sporting event ever held in Turkmenistan. President of the Union Cycliste Internationale (UCI) David Lappartient called the Ashgabat Velodrome  "one of the most beautiful in the world" and noted that it was thanks to this structure that it was decided to grant Turkmenistan the right to host the World Track Cycling Championship in 2021.

In June 2021 the UCI announced that the championships would be moved to a different venue. Roubaix was announced as the new venue in August 2021.

Schedule
22 events were held.

All times are local (UTC+2).

Medal summary

Medal table

Men

Women

Shaded events are non-Olympic

References

External links
Results book

 
UCI Track Cycling World Championships by year
World Championships
UCI
UCI
International cycle races hosted by France